The Bristol Activities of Daily Living Scale (BADLS) is a 20-item questionnaire designed to measure the ability of someone with dementia to carry out daily activities such as dressing, preparing food and using transport.

References

External links

Dementia
Geriatrics
Medical scales